
Robert Alan Jarrow is the Ronald P. and Susan E. Lynch Professor of Investment Management at the Johnson Graduate School of Management, Cornell University.  Professor Jarrow is a co-creator of the Heath–Jarrow–Morton framework for pricing interest rate derivatives, a co-creator of the reduced form Jarrow–Turnbull credit risk models employed for pricing credit derivatives, and the creator of the forward price martingale measure. These tools and models are now the standards utilized for pricing and hedging in major investment and commercial banks.

He is on the advisory board of Mathematical Finance – a journal he co-started in 1989.  He is also an associate or advisory editor for numerous other journals and serves on the board of directors of several firms and professional societies.  He is currently both an IAFE senior fellow and an FDIC senior fellow.  He has served as the Director for Research of Kamakura Corporation since 1995.

Professor Jarrow has been the recipient of numerous prizes and awards including the CBOE Pomerance Prize for Excellence in the Area of Options Research, the Graham and Dodd Scrolls Award, and the 1997 International Association of Financial Engineers IAFE/SunGard Financial Engineer of the Year Award. He is included in both the Fixed Income Analysts Society Hall of Fame and Risk Magazine's 50 member Hall of Fame.

Publications include five books - Options Pricing, Finance Theory, Modeling Fixed Income Securities and Interest Rate Options (second edition), Derivative Securities (second edition), and And Introduction to Derivative Securities, Financial Markets, and Risk Management - as well as over 100 publications in leading finance and economic journals.

He graduated magna cum laude from Duke University in 1974 with a major in mathematics, received an MBA from the Tuck School of Business at Dartmouth College in 1976 with highest distinction, and in 1979 he obtained a PhD in finance from the MIT Sloan School of Management under Robert C. Merton.

Selected publications

 Oldfield, George S.; Jarrow, Robert A. (1988) "Forward Options and Futures Options". Advances in Futures and Options Research

See also
 Heath–Jarrow–Morton framework
 Jarrow–Turnbull model

References

External links
Profile, johnson.cornell.edu
Profile, kamakuraco.com
Vita
SSRN Author page

Living people
American economists
Financial economists
Mathematical finance
Cornell University faculty
Johnson School faculty
Tuck School of Business alumni
Duke University Trinity College of Arts and Sciences alumni
MIT Sloan School of Management alumni
Year of birth missing (living people)
Date of birth missing (living people)